The Asian Junior Chess Championship is an annual chess tournament open to players in Asia and Oceania (FIDE Zones 3.1 to 3.7) who are under 20 years of age. The tournament has been held annually since 1977 with occasional interruptions. Since 1985, a separate Asian championship for girls has also been organized. Since at least 1996, the two championships have always been held concurrently.

Competition
The championships are organized by national federations affiliated with the Asian Chess Federation. They are open to chess players who are under 20 years of age as of 1 January of the year in which the championship is held. The championships are organized as a round-robin or a Swiss-system tournament depending on the number of participants. Since 2006, the open championship has been a nine-round Swiss.

The winners of the open and girls' championships earn the right to participate in the next year's World Junior Chess Championships. In the open championship, the top three players after tiebreaks all earn the International Master title, while the first-placed player additionally earns a norm towards the Grandmaster title. In the girls' championship, the top three players after tiebreaks all earn the Woman International Master title, while the first-placed player additionally earns a norm towards the Woman Grandmaster title.

Results

Open championship

Results are taken from Olimpbase unless otherwise indicated.

Girls' championship

Results between 1988 and 1996 are incomplete. Later results are taken from Olimpbase unless otherwise indicated.

Notes

See also
African Junior Chess Championship
Pan American Junior Chess Championship
European Junior Chess Championship
European Youth Chess Championship

References

Supranational chess championships
1977 in chess
Recurring sporting events established in 1977
Women's chess competitions
1985 in chess
Recurring sporting events established in 1985
Chess in Asia
Chess in Oceania
Chess_Championship
Under-20 sports competitions